The 2015 Trofeo Faip–Perrel was a professional tennis tournament played on hard courts. It was the tenth edition of the tournament which was part of the 2015 ATP Challenger Tour. It took place in Bergamo, Italy between 9 and 15 February 2015.

Singles main-draw entrants

Seeds

 1 Rankings are as of February 2, 2015.

Other entrants
The following players received wildcards into the singles main draw:
  Enzo Couacaud
  Andrea Falgheri
  Federico Gaio
  Roberto Marcora

The following players received entry from the qualifying draw:
  Mirza Bašić
  Daniel Brands
  Martin Fischer
  Maxime Teixeira

The following players received entry into the main draw as an alternate:
  Benoît Paire
  Axel Michon

The following player gained entry into the main draw via protected ranking:
  Philipp Petzschner

Champions

Singles

 Benoît Paire def.  Aleksandr Nedovyesov, 6–3, 7–6(7–3)

Doubles

 Martin Emmrich /  Andreas Siljeström def.  Błażej Koniusz /  Mateusz Kowalczyk, 6–4, 7–5

External links
Official Website

Trofeo Faip-Perrel
Trofeo Faip–Perrel